The Palumbo–Donahue School of Business is one of the colleges that comprises Duquesne University in Pittsburgh, Pennsylvania. The composite name "Palumbo-Donahue" refers to both the A.J. Palumbo School of Business Administration and the John F. Donahue Graduate School of Business.

History
The A. J. Palumbo School of Business Administration was established in 1913 as the School of Accounts and Finance. The name was changed to "School of Business Administration" in 1931 so as reflect the expansion of its course offerings. By 1961, the School had earned accreditation by the AACSB, joining the less than 30 percent of business schools nationwide who have achieved this distinction. With an October 1991 endowment by Antonio J. Palumbo, the current name was adopted: the A.J. Palumbo School of Business Administration.

Programs offered

Palumbo School of Business Administration
The Palumbo School offers the Bachelor of Science degree in Business Administration.

Donahue Graduate School of Business
The Donahue School offers a traditional M.B.A. or M.B.A. in Sustainability degrees as well as M.S. degrees in management, accountancy, analytics & information management, and supply chain management. Additionally, the School offers three master's certificates and two micro-credentials.

MBA-Sustainable Business Practices
The MBA-Sustainable Business Practices (MBA-SBP) is a Sustainable MBA that integrates sustainability-oriented coursework and consulting projects into the program curriculum. This program has earned considerable recognition since its launch. In 2008, the program was awarded the Page Prize for excellence in business sustainability education. In 2018, Dr Robert Sroufe received the Aspen Institute "Ideas Worth Teaching" award, which recognizes professors and classes that redefine business education and practice.

The MBA-SBP was ranked as the number one sustainability MBA program in the United States in the Corporate Knights Better World MBA ranking.

Administration
The dean of the Palumbo–Donahue School of Business is Dr. Dean McFarlin.

References

External links
 The A.J. Palumbo School of Business Administration
 The John F. Donahue Graduate School of Business website
 Duquesne MBA - Sustainability website

School Palumbo
Educational institutions established in 1913
1913 establishments in Pennsylvania